Charles F. Dunkl (born 1941 in Vienna) is a mathematician at the University of Virginia who introduced Dunkl operators.

Selected works
 
 with Donald E. Ramirez: 
 with Donald E. Ramirez: 
 
 with Donald E. Ramirez: 
 
 
 
 
 
 with M. F. E. de Jeu; E. M. Opdam: 
 
 with Yuan Xu: 
 with E. M. Opdam:

References

Charles F. Dunkl

1941 births
Living people
20th-century American mathematicians
21st-century American mathematicians